Morghab or Murgab may refer to:

Murgab River (Afghanistan)
Morghab, Afghanistan
Morghab, Iran, a village in Kerman Province, Iran
Morghab, Khuzestan, a village in Khuzestan Province, Iran